The Symphony No. 4 in E minor, Op. 98 by Johannes Brahms is the last of his symphonies. Brahms began working on the piece in Mürzzuschlag, then in the Austro-Hungarian Empire, in 1884, just a year after completing his Symphony No. 3. It was premiered on October 25, 1885, in Meiningen, Germany.

Instrumentation

The symphony is scored for two flutes (one doubling on piccolo in the third movement only), two oboes, two clarinets, two bassoons,  contrabassoon (third and fourth movements), four horns, two trumpets, three trombones (fourth movement only), timpani (two in first and second movements, three in third and fourth movements), triangle (third movement only), and strings.

Movements

The symphony is divided into four movements with the following tempo markings:

This is the only one of Brahms' four symphonies to end in a minor key. A typical performance lasts about 40 minutes.

Analysis

I. Allegro non troppo 

This movement is in sonata form, although it features some unique approaches to development. For instance, there is no repeat of the exposition; according to Malcolm MacDonald, the music is so "powerfully organic and continuously unfolding" that such a repeat would hinder forward progress.

The opening theme is initially serene in character, although its composition in a chain of descending thirds adds a fateful air. Its left-versus-right fragmented melodic form (duh-DUM, da-DEE, duh-DUM, da-DEE) also introduces a feeling of conflict which Brahms uses as a fundamental motivation throughout the movement.

{| class="wikitable" border="1"
|-
! Bar
! Section
! Key
! Description
|-
| 1
| Primary theme
| E minor
| Starts with pick-up note. This relatively fragmented melody forms a descending sequence in the upper instruments in dialogue with the lower instruments. The notes (taken out of register) outline a row of descending thirds – B, G, E, C, A, F, D, B – a unifying motif for this work.
|-
| 19
| Transition modulation to second theme
| Goes from E minor to the dominant B minor
| Starts by fragmenting the primary theme
|-
| 53
| Transition motif
|
| Transition motif: a rhythmic pattern in the woodwinds
|-
| 57
| Secondary theme period 1
| B minor
| Initially in the cellos, then passed up into the violins with intermittent play with transition motif.
|-
| 95
| Secondary theme period 2
| B major – parallel major of B minor
| In the woodwinds.
|-
| 107
| Closing section
| B major
|-
| 137
| Transition modulation to development
| Lead from B major into E minor
| Using primary theme material
|-
| 145
| Development
| Various
| Starts with a statement of the primary theme before leading away into a development
|-
| 247
| Recapitulation
| E minor -> E major
| Slow version of primary theme in the upper instruments (initially in C major harmony) with intermittent use of transition motif followed by lengthy recapitulation of secondary theme block now transposed to the tonic key.
|-
| 394
| Coda
| E minor
|}

II. Andante moderato 

Featuring a theme in E Phrygian, heard at the beginning unaccompanied and at the end with a lush orchestral accompaniment in the dominant scale, this movement has a modified sonata form with no development section.

{| class="wikitable" border="1"
|-
! Bar
! Section
! Key
! Description
|-
| 1
| Introduction
| E Phrygian
| Introduction to the principal theme by horns
|-
| 5
| Principal theme
| E major
| Several statements of the principal theme
|-
| 36
| Transition theme
| B major
| Dominated by the wind sections
|-
| 41
| Secondary theme
| B major
| Initially in the cellos, then passed up into the violins
|-
| 50
| Secondary theme cadence and transition theme
| B major
|-
| 64
| Recapitulation
| E major
| Recapitulation quite similar in structure to the exposition
|-
| 106
| Coda
| E Phrygian dominant
| Free play of themes with frequent use of arpeggios
|}

III. Allegro giocoso

This movement is the only one with the character of a scherzo to be found in Brahms' symphonies. It is not in typical scherzo form, however, being in 2/4 time and in sonata form, without a trio. The sonata form itself is modified further, with a foreshortened recapitulation and with the secondary theme nearly absent in the development and coda.

{| class="wikitable" border="1"
|-
! Bar
! Section
! Key
! Description
|-
| 1
| Primary theme
| C major and E major
| Primary theme consisting of three different periods (ordered 1–2–3–1)
|-
| 46
| Transition to secondary theme
| Transition to G major
| Based on the first period of the primary theme
|-
| 52
| Secondary theme
| G major
| Secondary theme followed by elements of a transition to the development
|-
| 89
| Development
| Various keys
| Based on the primary theme block with a slow trio-like section based on the second period of the first theme.
|-
| 181
| Transition to recapitulation
| Modulation from D major to C major
| 
|-
| 199
| Recapitulation
| C and G key areas
| Restatement of primary theme starting with the second period (2–3–1) followed by restatement the secondary theme and then transition theme leading to coda
|-
| 282
| Coda
| C and G key areas
| Final statement of the period 1 and 2 of the primary theme block (in the order 1–2–1)
|}

IV. Allegro energico e passionato

This last movement is notable as a rare example of a symphonic passacaglia, which is similar to a chaconne with the slight difference that the subject can appear in more voices than the bass. For the repeating theme, Brahms adapted the chaconne theme in the closing movement of Johann Sebastian Bach's cantata, Nach dir, Herr, verlanget mich, BWV 150.

An analysis of this last movement by Walter Frisch provides yet further interpretation to Brahms' structure of this work, by giving sections sonata form dimensions.

Arnold Schoenberg, in his essay Brahms the Progressive (Brahms is often characterized as a conservative composer), pointed out several thematic relationships in the score, as does Malcolm MacDonald in his biography of the composer. The first half of the chaconne theme is anticipated in the violins during the coda at an important point of the preceding movement; and the first movement's descending thirds, transposed by a fifth, appear in counterpoint during one of the final variations of the chaconne, immediately before the coda.

{| class="wikitable" border="1"
|-
! Bar
! Section
! Key
! Description
|-
| 1
| Theme
| E minor
| Statement of theme and main chordal structure
|-
| 9
| Variations 1–11
| Mostly in E minor and C major key areas as well as in other keys
| Variations match the bar count and chordal structure (though in some variations transposed to different key).  time
|-
| 97
| Variations 12–15
| E major and A major key area
| Variations match the bar count (though with bars lasting twice as long) and chordal structure ((though transposed to different key areas)).  time
|-
| 129
| Variations 16–23
| E major and A major key area
| Variations match the bar count and chordal structure (though transposed to different key areas).  time
|-
| 193
| Variations 24–26
| Mostly in E minor and C major key area
| Structurally variation 24 is similar to variation 1, variation 25 is similar to variation 2 and variation 26 is similar to variation 3.  time
|-
| 217
| Variations 27–30
| Mostly in E minor and C major key area
| Variations match the bar count and chordal structure (though transposed to different key areas).  time
|-
| 249
| Transition to coda
| E major and C major key area
| Extension of the last variation (variation 30).
|-
| 253
| Coda
| Many different key areas
| Playing on material from the variations with intermittent quasi-variations
|-
| 297
| Final statement of theme
| E minor
| Compressed statement of theme and final cadence
|}

Notable recordings
There are many recordings with Wilhelm Furtwängler (several times), Eugen Jochum, Otto Klemperer, Hermann Abendroth, Yevgeny Mravinsky, Nikolaus Harnoncourt, Leopold Stokowski, Richard Tognetti, Dietrich Fischer-Dieskau, John Barbirolli, Daniel Barenboim, Sergiu Celibidache, William Steinberg, Willem Mengelberg, Hans Knappertsbusch, Igor Markevitch, Serge Koussevitzky, Leonard Bernstein, John Eliot Gardiner, Carlo Maria Giulini, Carlos Kleiber, and others, with the Vienna Philharmonic, Berlin Philharmonic, Australian Chamber Orchestra, Royal Concertgebouw Orchestra, Leningrad Philharmonic, Chamber Orchestra of Europe, Boston Symphony, London Philharmonic, Philharmonia Orchestra, Pittsburgh Symphony, Staatskapelle Berlin, and others.  Progressive rock group Yes's keyboardist Rick Wakeman abridged and arranged the third movement for various keyboards as the instrumental "Cans and Brahms" from the 1971 album Fragile.

Reception

The work was given its premiere in Meiningen on October 25, 1885, with Brahms himself conducting. The piece had earlier been given to a small private audience in a version for two pianos, played by Brahms and Ignaz Brüll. Brahms' friend and biographer Max Kalbeck, reported that the critic Eduard Hanslick, acting as one of the page-turners, exclaimed on hearing the first movement at this performance: "For this whole movement I had the feeling that I was being given a beating by two incredibly intelligent people." Hanslick, however, wrote also that "[for] the musician, there is not another modern piece so productive as a subject for study.  It is like a dark well; the longer we look into it, the more brightly the stars shine back."

The musicologist Donald Francis Tovey praises the work as “one of the greatest orchestral works since Beethoven,” and singles out the end of the first movement, which “bears comparison with the greatest climaxes in classical music, not excluding Beethoven.”

The symphony is rich in allusions, most notably to various Beethoven compositions. The symphony may well have been inspired by the play Antony and Cleopatra, which Brahms had been researching at the time.

Notes

References
 Walter Frisch. Brahms: The Four Symphonies (New Haven: Yale University Press, 2003), pp. 115–140

External links
 
Downloadable score of the piece in .pdf format
Allusive Irony in Brahms's Fourth Symphony. (Analysis of Allusions in the Symphony) by Kenneth Hull
Detailed Listening Guide using the recording by Claudio Abbado
Andrew Clements, "Brahms: Symphony No. 4" (from "Building a Classical Library" series).  The Guardian, 17 March 2000.
Online Audio-Video of the first two minutes of the final movement (Berlin Philharmonics under Sir Simon Rattle)
Online audio-video of Vera Hsu and Chiming Shui performing the first movement as scored by Brahms for two pianos.

Symphonies by Johannes Brahms
1884 compositions
Compositions in E minor